Stigmella condaliafoliella is a moth of the family Nepticulidae. It is found in Florida, United States.

The wingspan is 2.8-3.1 mm.

The larvae feed on Condalia ferrea. They mine the leaves of their host plant. The mine is located at the upper-side of the leaf and is described as serpentine with black frass in a continuous central line.

External links
Nepticulidae of North America
A taxonomic revision of the North American species of Stigmella (Lepidoptera: Nepticulidae)

Nepticulidae
Moths of North America
Moths described in 1900